The 2007 Cal Poly Mustangs football team represented California Polytechnic State University during the 2007 NCAA Division I FCS football season.

Cal Poly competed in the Great West Football Conference (GWFC). The Mustangs were led by seventh-year head coach Rich Ellerson and played home games at Mustang Stadium in San Luis Obispo, California. The team finished the season with a record of seven wins and four losses (7–4, 2–2 GWFC). In this very high scoring season, the Mustangs outscored their opponents 432–278, scoring an average of almost 40 points a game.

Schedule

Notes

References

Cal Poly
Cal Poly Mustangs football seasons
Cal Poly Mustangs football